Glorious Day - Hymns of Faith is an album by Christian rock band Casting Crowns. It was released in 2015 and contains Casting Crowns' Until the Whole World Hears singles "Glorious Day (Living He Loved Me)" and "Blessed Redeemer", acoustic versions of "If We Are the Body" and "Praise You In This Storm", as well as eight hymns, mostly covers. The album peaked at No. 52 on Billboard 200, staying one week in the charts.

The album has also been contributed to the Cracker Barrel Old Country Store Exclusive Music Program.

Reception
The album received 4 out of 5 stars on CCM Magazine.

Track listing

References

2015 albums
Casting Crowns albums
Christian rock albums by American artists